Susana Cook is an Argentinean-born, New York City-based experimental performance artist who has been writing and producing original work for over 20 years.

Cook began studying drama and performing in Argentina, before moving to New York City in 1993.

Works
The Fury of the Gods (2010)
The unPatriotic Act: Homeland Insecurities (2007)
The Idiot King (2006)
The Values Horror Show (2005)
100 Years of Attitude (2004)
Dykenstein: Sex, Horror and the Tragedy of the Straight Brain (2003)
Hamletango: Prince of Butches (2002)
Spic for Export (2002)
The Fraud (2001)
Gross National Product (2000)
Conga Guerilla Forest (1999)
Hot Tamale (1999)
We are Faking our National Orgasm (1999)
Bitches are a Girl’s Best Friend (1998)
Parable of the Sour (1998)
Rats: The Fantasy of Extermination (1998)
Butch Fashion Show in the Femme Auto Body Shop (1997)
Post Colonial Butches: Post Patriarchal Femmes and other Blessings (1997)
Gender Acts (1996)
Tango Lesbiango (1996)
The Service Economy Vaudeville (1996)
The Title: A Parody of Opera, Angels and Tango (1994)
Las Tres Américas (1992)

References

External links
Susana Cook performance videos at the NYU Hemispheric Institute Digital Video Library
Susana Cook website

Living people
Argentine emigrants to the United States
American performance artists
American women dramatists and playwrights
American women performance artists
American lesbian writers
Hispanic and Latino American dramatists and playwrights
Argentine LGBT dramatists and playwrights
Year of birth missing (living people)
American LGBT dramatists and playwrights
Lesbian dramatists and playwrights
21st-century American women writers